The South Dakota State Jackrabbits football team represents South Dakota State University in college football. The program competes at the NCAA Division I Football Championship Subdivision (FCS) level as member of the Missouri Valley Football Conference (MVFC). The Jackrabbits play their home games at Dana J. Dykhouse Stadium on South Dakota State's campus in Brookings, South Dakota. South Dakota State is considered to be among the few perennial powers in the FCS. South Dakota State is also one of only 13 FCS schools to host ESPN's College GameDay. For the 2019 GameDay matchup, the No. 3 Jackrabbits hosted the No. 1 North Dakota State Bison, where they would lose in a close battle 23–16 after losing their starting QB to a season ending knee injury. The Jackrabbits currently have a 12-year streak of qualifying for the FCS playoffs, the second-longest in the country at the FCS level (the longest being North Dakota State at 13).

History
The Jackrabbits were an NCAA Division II program in the North Central Conference until moving to the Football Championship Subdivision in 2004. In March 2004, SDSU initially began their Division I FCS era by being a charter member of the now-defunct Great West Football Conference (along with North Dakota State, Southern Utah, Cal Poly, UC Davis, Northern Colorado) and stayed there until 2007 when they were accepted into the Missouri Valley Football Conference and began league play in the 2008 season. South Dakota State University has invested in their football program's facilities recently as they have some of the finest amenities and facilities at the FCS level including the largest video/scoreboard in the FCS (2015) a new 19,340 seat stadium (2016), and a large state-of-the-art student-athlete center in the north end zone (2010). Connected to the student-athlete center is one of the largest indoor practice facilities in NCAA Division I (completed in 2014). Due to the success of South Dakota State and North Dakota State football programs, the Dakota Marker game was featured on ESPN’s nationally televised College GameDay on October 26, 2019, becoming one of only a few FCS programs to be featured on the show. South Dakota State reached the Football Championship Subdivision semi-finals five times in 2017, 2018 and 2020, 2021 and 2022 respectively. They advanced to their first national championship game on May 8, 2021 after defeating the Delaware Fightin' Blue Hens 33–3 in the national semi-finals. They played No. 2 Sam Houston State for the national championship on May 16, 2021 and lost 23–21. The Jackrabbits finished the season 8–2 and as national runner-ups. A year and a half later on January 8, 2023 they advanced to the national championship game again where they would win their first national title over conference rival North Dakota State, 45–21.

Classifications
1952–1972: NCAA College Division
1973–2003: NCAA Division II
2004–present: NCAA Division I–AA/FCS

Conference affiliations
 Independent (1889–1921)
 North Central Intercollegiate Athletic Conference (1922–2003)
 Great West Conference (2004–2007)
 Missouri Valley Football Conference (2008–present)

Players in the National Football League
A total of 34 Jackrabbits have played for NFL teams, including seven currently.
 Jordan Brown - free agent
 Dallas Goedert - Philadelphia Eagles
 Christian Rozeboom - Los Angeles Rams
 Cade Johnson - Seattle Seahawks
 Pierre Strong Jr. - New England Patriots
 Christian Rozeboom - Los Angeles Rams
 Chris Oladokun - Kansas City Chiefs

29 Jackrabbits have been drafted in the NFL Draft. As of 2021, Jim Langer is the only Jackrabbit to be inducted into the Pro Football Hall of Fame.

Record versus Missouri Valley Football Conference

 Records current as of November 2021

FCS Playoffs results
As of January 8, 2023, the Jackrabbits have appeared in the FCS playoffs twelve times with an overall record of 18–11. They have made 11 consecutive appearances in the FCS playoffs, currently the second-longest streak in the nation.

Division II Playoffs results
The Jackrabbits have appeared in the Division II playoffs one time with an overall record of 0–1.

Head coaches

Facilities

 Dana J. Dykhouse Stadium (19,340 capacity)
 Sanford Jackrabbit Athletic Complex (SJAC)
 Dykhouse Student-Athlete Center (Connected to SJAC in north end zone)

In 2014, South Dakota State University started construction of a new stadium on the location of the current Coughlin-Alumni Stadium. The new stadium has a total seating capacity of 19,340 with easy expansion to 22,500.

The Sanford Jackrabbit Athletic Complex is the Jackrabbits new State-of-the-art indoor practice facility. The facility was opened on October 11, 2014. The SJAC has bleacher seating for up to 1,000 spectators and can be used for football practice, track practice, softball and baseball practice, track competitions, and other events within the SDSU athletic department. The 149,284-square foot facility is the largest indoor practice facility in Division I athletics and features an eight-lane, 300-meter track which is only one of five collegiate indoor tracks of that size in the nation. Inside the track is an 80-yard football field plus end zones at each end and is composed of a soy-based Astroturf. Within the facility it has areas for sports medicine and strength and conditioning. Sports medicine features include rehab space, a training room, weight room expansion, hydrotherapy, a football team room, offices and academic advising facilities. The SJAC is used by many of SDSU's athletic programs.

All-Time statistical leaders

Single-game leaders
 Passing Yards: Dan Fjeldheim (460, 9/28/2002)
 Rushing Yards: Zach Zenner (295 2x, 11-24-2012, 9/7/2013)
 Receiving Yards: Jeff Tiefenthaler (256, 9/27/1986)

Single-Season leaders
 Passing Yards: Taryn Christion (3,714, 2016)
 Rushing Yards: Josh Ranek (2,055, 1999)
 Receiving Yards: Jeff Tiefenthaler (1,534, 1986)

Career leaders
 Passing Yards: Taryn Christion (11,535, 2015–2018)
 Rushing Yards: Josh Ranek, (6,744, 1997–2001)
 Receiving Yards: Jake Wieneke (5,157, 2014–2017)

Media coverage
All home and road games are covered on the Jackrabbit Sports Network. The broadcast range of the Jackrabbit Sports Network covers eight states (South Dakota, Minnesota, North Dakota, Iowa, Nebraska, Missouri, Kansas, and Wyoming), and consists of the following stations:
 WNAX 570AM (Flagship Station)
 KJJQ 910AM
 KRKI 99.5FM
 KOLY 1300AM
 KBFS 1450AM
 KGFX 1060AM
 KXLG 99.1FM

The team does not have an official television partner, but Jackrabbit games have been televised on Midco Sports Net, Fox College Sports, the Big Ten Network, Fox Sports North, ESPN+, ESPN, ABC and local television networks.

Record against FBS competition
Overall 2–10.

Future non-conference opponents 
Announced schedules as of November 28, 2022.

References

External links
 

 
American football teams established in 1900
1900 establishments in South Dakota